HMS Invincible was a 74-gun third rate ship of the line of the Royal Navy, launched on 15 March 1808 at Woolwich.

She was employed as a coal hulk from 1857, and was broken up in 1861.

Notes

References

Lavery, Brian (2003) The Ship of the Line - Volume 1: The development of the battlefleet 1650-1850. Conway Maritime Press. .

Ships of the line of the Royal Navy
Ganges-class ships of the line
Coal hulks
1808 ships